"Leave the World Behind" is a song by Swedish DJ/producers Axwell, Ingrosso and Angello and Dutch-Filipino DJ/producer Laidback Luke. It features Canadian singer Deborah Cox.

Track listings

Chart performance
The song has climbed to number 39 on the Swedish Charts and it peaked at #40 on the US Dance chart.

Charts

References 

2009 songs
2009 singles
Deborah Cox songs
Music videos shot in Norway
Songs written by Steve Angello
Songs written by Axwell
Songs written by Sebastian Ingrosso
Steve Angello songs
Axwell songs
Sebastian Ingrosso songs
Laidback Luke songs
Songs written by Deborah Cox